The La Ceiba Wildlife Refuge is a private wildlife refuge in Costa Rica, part of the Tempisque Conservation Area, which protects tropical forest on the Nicoya Peninsula  near the small village of San Rafael in Paquera District in the Puntarenas Province.

The area protected is covered by tropical dry forest and contains a small camping site and two cabins inside the reserve used by ecotourists, which helps fund the project.

References

Nature reserves in Costa Rica
Geography of Puntarenas Province